The team technical routine competition at 2013 World Aquatics Championships was held on July 20–22 with the preliminary round on July 20 and the final on July 22.

Results
The preliminary round was held on July 20 at 14:00 and the final on July 22 at 19:00.

Green denotes finalists

References

Synchronised swimming at the 2013 World Aquatics Championships